The Chronicles of Morgaine is a 1985 omnibus of the first three science fantasy novels from The Morgaine Stories by C. J. Cherryh. The three novels included are Gate of Ivrel, Well of Shiuan and Fires of Azeroth.

Plot summary
The Chronicles of Morgaine is a story in which the safety of all the worlds is threatened by the transdimensional Gates.

Reception
Colin Greenland reviewed The Chronicles of Morgaine for Imagine magazine, and stated that "Cherryh's sword and sorcery is sombre and strong. She enters the minds and hearts of her characters as they struggle, with the odds and with each other."

Reviews
Review by Helen McNabb (1985) in Paperback Inferno, #56

References

External links

1985 fiction books
Science fiction book series by C. J. Cherryh